The Great Offices of State are senior offices in the UK government. They are the Prime Minister, Chancellor of the Exchequer, Foreign Secretary and Home Secretary or, alternatively, three of those offices excluding the Prime Minister.

Current

History
The Great Offices of State are derived from the most senior positions in the Royal Household – the Great Officers of State. These eventually became hereditary and honorary titles, while the substantive duties of the Officers passed to individuals who were appointed on behalf of the Crown. James Callaghan is the first and, to date, only person to have served in all four positions.

According to a YouGov poll conducted in 2017, the British public view the three most senior Cabinet ministers to the Chancellor, the Secretary of State for Health and Social Care, and the Secretary of State for Defence, with the office of Home Secretary coming in fourth place, and that of Foreign Secretary in just ninth place, preceded by the Secretary of State for Work and Pensions and followed by the Secretary of State for International Trade. The office of Secretary of State for Digital, Culture, Media and Sport was viewed as least important, with just 3% of respondents saying they viewed it as one of the most important positions. 

The Truss ministry, formed on 6 September 2022, had no white men holding positions in the Great Offices of State, for the first time in British political history. This remained the case for just 38 days until the appointment of Jeremy Hunt as Chancellor of the Exchequer on 14 October 2022, replacing Kwasi Kwarteng who had been the first black Chancellor. Five days later on 19 October 2022, Grant Shapps was appointed Home Secretary, replacing Suella Braverman, although Braverman was then reappointed by incoming Prime Minister Rishi Sunak just six days later.

See also
 Cabinet of the United Kingdom
 List of shadow holders of the Great Offices of State

References 

Ministerial offices in the United Kingdom